Andrej Martin was the defending champion but chose not to defend his title.

Emilio Nava won the title after defeating Sebastian Fanselow 6–4, 7–6(7–3) in the final.

Seeds

Draw

Finals

Top half

Bottom half

References

External links
Main draw
Qualifying draw

Shymkent Challenger - 1
2022 Singles